Akatov (masculine) or Akatova (feminine) is a Russian last name. A variant of this name is Akatyev/Akatyeva (/). It derives from the first name Akaky, which is of Greek origin and means placable, innocent.

People with the last name
Vyacheslav Akatov, Russian reporter murdered in 2006

Toponyms
Akatova, alternative name of Akatovo, a village in Ivanovskoye Rural Settlement of Ruzsky District in Moscow Oblast; 
Akatova, alternative name of Akatovo, a village under the administrative jurisdiction of the Town of Yegoryevsk in Yegoryevsky District of Moscow Oblast;

See also
Akatovo, several rural localities in Russia

References

Notes

Sources
Ю. А. Федосюк (Yu. A. Fedosyuk). "Русские фамилии: популярный этимологический словарь" (Russian Last Names: a Popular Etymological Dictionary). Москва, 2006. 



Russian-language surnames